Just Before Nightfall is a 1971 crime drama film written and directed by Claude Chabrol, based on the 1951 novel The Thin Line by Edward Atiyah. Audran won the BAFTA Award for Best Actress in a Leading Role for her role at the 27th British Academy Film Awards.

Plot
Charles Masson (Bouquet), an advertising  account executive, is having an affair with Laura (Douking), the wife of his best friend, world-renowned architect François Tellier (Périer). Their sex life consists of sadomasochistic behavior, and in one of their heated sessions, Charles accidentally strangles Laura. Completely confused, Charles leaves the borrowed apartment in Paris and runs into François at a nearby bistro. The two drive back together to Versailles, where they have beautiful adjoining houses designed by François. The owner of the apartment had seen Laura and Charles together two months earlier, but she does not tell the police because of François. Even though the police do not seem to have any clues to the crime, Charles has a difficult time coping with the situation, and tries to lead a normal life with his two children and loving wife Hélène (Audran).

Principal cast

Critical reception
Roger Ebert of The Chicago Sun-Times gave the film 3 1/2 out of 4 stars:

Mike Sutton of The Digital Fix:

See also
The Stranger Within a Woman (1966)

References

External links 

1971 films
1971 drama films
1970s psychological thriller films
Adultery in films
BDSM in films
Films based on British novels
Films directed by Claude Chabrol
Films shot in France
Films shot in Paris
French drama films
French thriller films
1970s French films